Balbriggan was a type of hosiery fabric. It was a finely knitted cotton cloth predominantly used for men's underwear. Originally it was made of unbleached Egyptian cotton that imparts natural colored tones such as dark cream and tan. The fabric's name refers to the city in which it was manufactured, Balbriggan in Ireland. The city prospered as a result of the fabric's production.

Structure 
Balbriggan was knitted fabric structure produced with a plain stitch on circular knitting machines. It was a lightweight fabric with a napped back on occasion.

Use 
Balbriggan initially used for men's undergarments latter used in outerwear garments like Pyjamas and certain sportswear.

See also 

 Jersey (fabric)

References 

Knitted fabrics